Roland Grahammer (born 3 November 1963) is a German former footballer.

Honours
 Bundesliga: 1988–89, 1989–90
 DFL-Supercup: 1990

References

External links
 

1963 births
Living people
German footballers
Germany B international footballers
Germany under-21 international footballers
Bundesliga players
2. Bundesliga players
FC Augsburg players
1. FC Nürnberg players
FC Bayern Munich footballers
Olympic footballers of West Germany
West German footballers
Footballers at the 1988 Summer Olympics
Olympic bronze medalists for West Germany
Olympic medalists in football
Sportspeople from Augsburg
Association football defenders
Footballers from Bavaria
Medalists at the 1988 Summer Olympics